Club Italia is an Italian women's volleyball club based in Rome, it is currently playing in the Serie A1; but it has played in the Serie A2 during season 2017/18.

Previous names
Due to sponsorship, the club have competed under the following names:
 Club Italia (1998–2016)
 Club Italia Crai (2016–present)

History
The team was founded in 1998 by then Italian federation sports director Julio Velasco, in order to develop the skills of younger players in a competitive league rather than in youth leagues. 
The team is directly controlled by the Italian Volleyball Federation, which is entitled to put the best younger scouted players in the team. 
After a lot of seasons in the lower leagues of Serie B1 and Serie B2, Club Italia was automatically promoted by the Italian Federation into Serie A2 (2nd tier) in 2014 and then into Serie A1 (first tier) in 2015, avoiding relegation in its first season. 
Over the next two seasons, Anna Danesi, Paola Egonu, Ofelia Malinov and Alessia Orro have been called up to the Italian national team while playing for Club Italia.
At the conclusion of the 2016–17 season, the club was relegated to Serie A2. The club returned to the Serie A1 in the 2018–19 season.

Squad
Season 2017–2018, as of September 2017.

Current coaching staff

References

External links

 Club website  at FIPAV

Italian women's volleyball clubs
Volleyball clubs established in 1998
1998 establishments in Italy
Volleyball in Rome
Sports clubs in Rome
Serie A1 (women's volleyball) clubs